XEAU-AM is a radio station on 1090 AM in Monterrey, Nuevo León, Mexico. It is owned by Multimedios Radio and carries Milenio Radio along with sister station XHFMTU-FM 103.7 HD3.

History
XEAU received its concession on February 21, 1969. It was jointly owned by Jesús Dionisio and Francisco Antonio González, founders of Multimedios, and operated as a 500-watt daytimer on 1080 kHz, though in the 1980s it moved to 1090, enabling the first of two power increases. Operations were consolidated under Francisco Antonio González Sánchez in 2000, three years after Jesús's death.

References

Mass media in Monterrey
Multimedios Radio